Overage may refer to:
 Cellphone overage charges
 Land-sale overage
 Overaging in metallurgy
 Being above a specified age limit